Cuizăuca is a village in Rezina District, Moldova.

Notable people 
 Valeriu Saharneanu 
 Vasile Odobescu 
 Victor Cobăsneanu
  Zoey Logan

References

Villages of Rezina District